This is a list of contestants who have appeared on the American reality television culinary competition, Top Chef. As of October 2, 2013, there were a total of 177 chefs who had competed throughout the whole series with 22 of them competing again in a succeeding season.

Contestants

 The chef won his/her season.
 The chef previously competed in a preceding season.
 The chef previously competed in a preceding season and won his/her present season.

Notes
: This is the number of Quickfire Challenges the chef had won.
: This is the number of Elimination Challenges the chef had won.
: Cynthia chose to leave the competition because her father was ill.
: Andrea originally placed eleventh, but since another chef voluntarily left, she was brought back to the competition.
: Otto chose to leave the competition deciding that his misconduct contributed to most of his team's loss.
: Josie and Marisa were in a double elimination.
: Mia chose to leave the competition fearing that another chef would be eliminated.
: Cliff was disqualified from the competition for aggressive physical contact with another chef.
: Elia and Sam were in a double elimination.
: Casey and Dale both shared the runner-up spot since both of them were eliminated in the finale.
: Lisa and Richard both shared the runner-up spot since both of them were eliminated in the finale.
: Eugene and Melissa were in a double elimination.
: Jeff originally placed seventh, but was brought back to the competition for winning a Quickfire Challenge against two other most recently eliminated chefs.
: Fabio and Jeff were in a double elimination.
: Carla and Stefan both shared the runner-up spot since both of them were eliminated in the finale.
: Bryan and Kevin both shared the runner-up spot since both of them were eliminated in the finale.
: Arnold and Lynne were in a double elimination.
: Angelo and Ed both shared the runner-up spot since both of them were eliminated in the finale.
: Dale and Stephen were in a double elimination.
: Jamie and Tiffani were in a double elimination.
: Colin, Simon and Tyler were eliminated in the first qualifying round.
: Nina was eliminated in the second qualifying round.
: Ashley, Berenice, Chaz, Jonathan and Kim were eliminated in the third qualifying round.
: Andrew, Janine, Laurent and Molly were eliminated in the final qualifying round.
: Dakota and Nyesha were in a double elimination.
: Beverly originally placed seventh, but was brought back to the competition for winning the Last Chance Kitchen.
: Anthony, Daniel, Gina, Jorel, Stephanie and Tina were eliminated in the qualifying round.
: Carla and Chrissy were eliminated in a double elimination.
: CJ and Tyler were eliminated in a double elimination.
: Kristen originally placed seventh, but was brought back to the competition for winning the Last Chance Kitchen.
: Louis and Shirley were eliminated in a double elimination.
: Louis originally placed eleventh, but was brought back to the competition for winning the Last Chance Kitchen.
: Kevin originally placed eighth, but was brought back to the competition for winning the Last Chance Kitchen.
: Stephanie and Bryan both shared the runner-up spot since both of them were eliminated in the finale.
: Nelson and Gabriel were eliminated in a double elimination.
: Jamie originally placed eleventh, but was brought back to the competition for winning the Last Chance Kitchen.
: Dawn and Shota both shared the runner-up spot since both of them were eliminated in the finale.
: Robert and Sarah were in a double elimination, but Sarah later returned to the competition after winning Last Chance Kitchen.
: Ashleigh originally placed tenth, but was brought back to the competition following Episode 5 of Last Chance Kitchen.
: Sarah originally placed eleventh, but was brought back to the competition after winning Last Chance Kitchen.
: Sarah and Evelyn both shared the runner-up spot since both of them were eliminated in the finale.

 
Top Chef contestants